Goddard's Green or Goddards Green may refer to several places in England:
Goddard's Green, Berkshire, a village near Reading
Goddards Green, West Sussex, a village near Burgess Hill
Goddard's Green, Kent, a location near Cranbrook, Kent